Hamish Linklater (born July 7, 1976) is an American actor and playwright. He is known for playing Matthew Kimble in The New Adventures of Old Christine, Andrew Keanelly in The Crazy Ones, and Clark Debussy in Legion. He is the son of dramatic vocal trainer Kristin Linklater.

In 2021, he starred as Father Paul in the Netflix horror miniseries Midnight Mass, for which he received high critical acclaim.

Early life
Linklater was born in Great Barrington, Massachusetts, the son of Kristin Linklater and James Lincoln Cormeny. His mother was a Scottish-born Professor of Theatre and Chair of the Acting Division at Columbia University and a teacher of vocal technique. A single mother, she raised her son partly in the Berkshires, where she was a founder of the Shakespeare & Company drama troupe. Linklater was eight years old when he began doing small Shakespearean roles.

His maternal grandparents were Marjorie Linklater, an arts campaigner, and Eric Linklater, who was a Scottish novelist of partly Swedish origin. His uncles are journalist Magnus Linklater and writer Andro Linklater.

Linklater graduated in 1994 from Commonwealth School in Boston and attended Amherst College.

Career
While first establishing himself on the stage, he made his big-screen debut in 2000's Groove. That was followed by his role as CNN correspondent Richard Roth in the HBO movie Live from Baghdad.  He has since appeared in numerous movies, including Fantastic Four (2005). He had a recurring role on the television show American Dreams as well as Gideon's Crossing. He was second-in-line to play Logan on Dark Angel, but the role went to Michael Weatherly.

From 2006 until 2010 he was a main cast member in the CBS sitcom The New Adventures of Old Christine, as the brother of Christine Campbell, played by Julia Louis-Dreyfus.

In July 2006, Linklater appeared in Keith Bunin's The Busy World Is Hushed opposite Jill Clayburgh off-Broadway at Playwrights Horizons. He played the title character in Hamlet at South Coast Repertory in Costa Mesa, California and the Long Wharf Theater in New Haven, Connecticut.

On Halloween 2007, Linklater appeared in an episode of Pushing Daisies on ABC, entitled "Girth". He also completed the film The Violent Kind.

He appeared in The Public Theater's 2009 production of Twelfth Night at Shakespeare in the Park as Sir Andrew Aguecheek, opposite Anne Hathaway, Audra McDonald and Raul Esparza.

In 2011, he starred with Miranda July in The Future. He made his Broadway debut in October 2011 in Theresa Rebeck's new play Seminar opposite Alan Rickman, Jerry O'Connell, Lily Rabe, and Hettienne Park.

In 2013, he played Brooklyn Dodgers pitcher Ralph Branca in the Jackie Robinson biopic film 42.  Linklater also joined the cast of Aaron Sorkin's The Newsroom in a recurring role, playing senior producer Jerry Dantana. He remained for six episodes, until earning the role of Andrew Keanelly on the CBS series The Crazy Ones, which premiered in September 2013.

In 2017, Linklater was cast in a recurring role in the FX original series Legion, based on the Marvel Comics character, and was promoted to the main cast for its second season. Also in 2017, he had a small role in the third season of the FX black comedy crime drama series Fargo, created by Legion showrunner Noah Hawley.

In 2020, Linklater was cast in the Amazon Prime series Tell Me Your Secrets as John, a convicted rapist seeking redemption by trying to find a missing girl. The series premiered on February 19, 2021.

In 2021, Linklater starred in Mike Flanagan's Netflix horror miniseries, Midnight Mass, as Father Paul Hill. It premiered September 24, 2021. He received high critical acclaim and a Critic's Choice nomination for the role. 

Also in 2021, he began filming Gaslit as Jeb Magruder, which premiered in 2022 on Starz. In 2022, Walter Hill's western Dead for a Dollar premiered at Venice Film Festival and in the United States, with Linklater playing wealthy villain Martin Kidd.

In 2022, Linklater began filming Downtown Owl, a film based on the Chuck Klosterman novel of the same name. Linklater is the screenwriter as well as a producer and director for the film.

Personal life
Linklater married playwright Jessica Goldberg in January 2002; they divorced in 2012 and have one daughter.

In 2013, Linklater began a relationship with actress Lily Rabe. They have two daughters, born in March 2017 and June 2020. In September 2021, the couple announced they were expecting their third child.

Filmography

Film

Television

References

External links

 

1976 births
20th-century American male actors
21st-century American male actors
American male film actors
American male stage actors
American male Shakespearean actors
American male television actors
American people of Scottish descent
American people of Swedish descent
American expatriates in the United Kingdom
Amherst College alumni
Living people
Male actors from Massachusetts
People from Great Barrington, Massachusetts
Commonwealth School alumni
Linklater family